Trephionus inexpectatus, is a species of beetle belonging to the family Carabidae. It is endemic to Japan.

Etymology
The specific name inexpectatus is due to unexpected discovery, where it was taken as another congeneric species.

Description
Body length of male is about 8.8 mm. Dorsal surface blackish brown to black. Endophallus stout in shape. No hind wings. Dorso-apical lobe conical. Apex of aedeagus truncate.

References

Beetles described in 2018
Platyninae